Ģirts Vilks (born 12 April 1968) is a Soviet rower. He won a gold medal at the 1990 World Rowing Championships in Tasmania with the men's quadruple sculls. He competed for the Unified Team at the 1992 Summer Olympics and came seventh in the quad scull.

References

External links 
 

1968 births
Living people
Soviet male rowers
World Rowing Championships medalists for the Soviet Union
Olympic rowers of the Unified Team
Rowers at the 1992 Summer Olympics